Redbank Township can refer to the following U.S. locations:

Redbank Township, Armstrong County, Pennsylvania
Redbank Township, Clarion County, Pennsylvania

Pennsylvania township disambiguation pages